The Egg may refer to:

Music
The Egg (band), British electronic music group

Albums
The Egg (album), by American band Shiner
The Egg (Mike Gordon album), 2013 live album recorded in 2011

Songs
 "The Egg" (song), by Shiner off the album The Egg (album)
"Albany", also known as "The Egg", a song by They Might Be Giants from Venue Songs

Film and television
The Egg (film), featuring Stan Laurel
"The Egg", animated TV series American Dragon: Jake Long episode

Writing
"The Egg" (de Camp short story), written by L. Sprague de Camp
"The Egg" (Weir short story), written by Andy Weir

Theatre
The Egg, Albany, performing arts venue in Albany, New York, USA
The Egg, Bath, a venue in Bath, England, UK
The Egg, Beirut, an abandoned theatre structure in Beirut, Lebanon
The Egg, National Centre for the Performing Arts (China), Beijing, China

Other uses
Instagram egg, a picture of a brown egg that became a meme
The Egg (roundabout), road junction in Tamworth, England
The Egg (L'Oeuf), an aluminum and plexiglass car designed by Paul Arzens

See also

 
 Egg (disambiguation)
 The Egg and I (disambiguation)
 The Egg Tree, novel by Katherine Milhous
 The Egg and Jerry, a Tom and Jerry short